Maria Camilla Lindberg (born 30 March 1977) is a Swedish professional boxer who has held the WIBF light-middleweight title since 2009. She previously held the WIBA light-middleweight title from 2010 to 2014 and has challenged for multiple world titles, including the WBO female middleweight title in 2011 and April 2021; the unified WBC and WBO female middleweight titles in 2017; and the WBC and IBF female light-middleweight titles in 2018 and 2019, respectively.

Professional career
After suffering a brain hemorrhage in an amateur bout in 1999, Lindberg received a life-time ban from boxing by the Swedish Boxing Federation. Unable to acquire a boxing license in Sweden, she moved to the US and began training at the Gleason's Gym in New York City. Lindberg made her professional debut on 1 July 2003, scoring a four-round unanimous decision (UD) victory against Katherin Pugh at the Omni New Daisy Theater in Memphis, Tennessee. Following her second fight–a draw against Ann Saccurato in May 2004–Lindberg was suspended by the American Association of Boxing Commissions and the European Boxing Union due to the brain injury she suffered in 1999. After four years out of the ring, she passed medical tests for the Bund Deutscher Berufsboxer (BDB) and received a license to box in Germany, making her return to the ring on 28 November 2008, scoring a majority decision (MD) victory against Pia Porter at the Maritim Hotel in Magdeburg.

In her next fight she fought for her first world title, facing Conjestina Achieng for the vacant WIBF middleweight title on 8 May 2009, at the Royal Event Center in Berlin. The bout ended in a split draw, with one judge scoring the bout 97–96 in favour of Lindberg, the second judge scoring it 97–95 for Achieng, while the third judge scored it even at 95–95, leaving the WIBF title vacant.

Lindberg moved down a weight class for her next fight, defeating Sara Davis via ten-round UD to capture the vacant WIBF light-middleweight on 19 September, at the Dampfnudel Arena in Rülzheim, Germany, with the judges scorecards reading 100–92, 99–91 and 98–92.

After successfully defending her title with a technical knockout (TKO) victory against Michaela Dragan in July 2010, Lindberg defeated Diane Schwachhofer via UD on 20 November, capturing the vacant WIBA light-middleweight title in Aachen, Germany.

She moved up in weight for her next fight, challenging WBO and WBF female middleweight champion Christina Hammer on 27 May 2011, at the Zlatopramen Arena in Ústí nad Labem, Czech Republic. Lindberg suffered the first defeat of her career, losing via UD.

Following three victories in non-title fights, she successfully defended her WIBA and WIBF titles with a third-round TKO against Edita Karabeg in May 2014, before making a defence against Mirjana Vujic on 1 November at the Aktionshalle Offerta in Karlsruhe, with the vacant GBU female title also on the line. The fight was initially ruled a no contest after the referee determined that Vujic was knocked out by an accidental clash of heads. However, upon review, the BDB changed the result to a TKO, awarding Lindberg her third world title. The pair had an immediate rematch on 13 December, with Lindberg emerging victorious with a fourth-round TKO.

After five more fights, with four wins and one no contest, she faced Christina Hammer in a rematch of their 2011 contest. The bout took place on 1 April 2017, at the Westfalenhallen in Dortmund, Germany, with Hammer's unified WBC and WBO female middleweight titles on the line. Lindberg suffered the second defeat of her career, losing via UD with all three judges scoring the bout 100–90.

She suffered another defeat in her next fight, losing via UD against Inna Sagaydakovskaya for the vacant WBC Silver female light-middleweight title on 29 September, at the Pabellón Municipal de Deportes La Casilla in Bilbao, Spain. The judges scorecards read 97–92, 97–92, and 96–93.

Her next fight was a successful defence of her WIBF and GBU female titles in March 2018, scoring a third-round stoppage against Lela Terashvili, before challenging Ewa Piątkowska for the WBC female light-middleweight title. The bout took place on 25 May at the Stadion Narodowy in Warsaw, Poland. Lindberg was unsuccessful in her third attempt at a major world title, losing via MD. Two judges scored the bout 96–94 while the third judge scored it 95–95.

After a UD victory against Mariam Tatunashvili in a non-title fight in April 2019, Lindberg challenged Marie-Eve Dicaire for the IBF female light-middleweight title on 28 June at the Montreal Casino in Canada. Lindberg suffered the fifth defeat of her career, losing via UD with the judges' scorecards reading 99–91, 99–91, and 98–92.

Following a TKO victory in a rematch against Edita Karabeg in August, Lindberg moved up to the super-middleweight division to challenge WIBA and WBF female champion Ema Kozin, with the vacant WIBF, GBU, and IBA female titles also on the line. The bout took place on 6 October at the Arena Stožice in Ljubljana, Slovenia. In what some media outlets viewed as a controversial decision, Lindberg suffered her sixth career defeat, losing via UD with the judges' scorecards reading 98–94, 96–94, and 96–94.

On 8 April 2021, it was announced that Lindberg would face WBO female middleweight champion Savannah Marshall on 10 April, at the Copper Box Arena in London, England. Lindberg was brought in as a late replacement after Marshall's original opponent, Femke Hermans, was forced to withdraw after a member of her team tested positive for COVID-19. On the night, Lindberg was knocked to the canvas in the second round after Marshall landed a right hand. She managed to make it back to her feet before the referee's count of ten to see out the remainder of the round. She was knocked down for a second time in the third round, again by a right hand, but failed to beat the count. It was Lindberg's only ever knockout (KO) defeat.

Professional boxing record

References

External links

Living people
1977 births
Sportspeople from Malmö
Swedish women boxers
Light-middleweight boxers
Middleweight boxers
Super-middleweight boxers
Women's International Boxing Association champions